Emma Shapplin (born Crystêle Madeleine Joliton on 19 May 1974, in the Paris suburb of Savigny-le-Temple) is a French soprano.

Discography

Albums 
Carmine Meo (1997, Pendragon Records/EMI)
Etterna (2002, Ark 21 Records/Universal Music Group)
Macadam Flower (2009, Nimue Music/Universal Music Group/Sony Music)
Dust of a Dandy (2014)
Venere (2019)

Other releases

Discovering Yourself (EP, 1999, Coeur de lion)
Spente le Stelle (Opera Trance) – The Remixes – Part One (remix album, 2000, Radikal Records)
The Concert in Caesarea (live DVD/CD, 2003, Pendragon Records/EMI)
The Macadam Flower Tour – live concert in Athens DVD (June 2011)

Career
When she was 18, singer Jean-Patrick Capdevielle convinced her to return to taking classical lessons so as to improve her singing technique. She discovered that although rock had given her more artistic freedom and hedonistic lifestyle than classical music, it was still not enough for her, so she decided to create her own style. This became a combination of early opera, modern trance and pop music. Shapplin and Capdevielle subsequently worked together on her first release, Carmine Meo, written by Capdevielle.

References

External links

 
 Official Facebook
 
  Emma Shapplin's biography
  Emma Shapplin's discography
  Emma Shapplin's album reviews

1974 births
Living people
Opera crossover singers
Contemporary classical music performers
New-age musicians
French dance musicians
French electronic musicians
English-language singers from France
Italian-language singers
Latin-language singers
French sopranos
21st-century French women singers
20th-century French women singers